Wasabi (Latin name Wasabia japonica) is also called Japanese horseradish.

Wasabi may also refer to:

In arts and entertainment

Characters
Wasabi, in the Sinfest webcomic
Wasabi, in the TV series Thumb Wrestling Federation
Wasabi-No-Ginger, a character from Big Hero 6
Dr. Wasabi, in the cartoon series Chop Socky Chooks
Wasabi Pow, in the cartoon Sushi Pack

Films
Wasabi (film), France, 2001

Music
"Wasabi" (Lee Harding song), 2005
"Wasabi" (Little Mix song), 2018
"Sci-Fi Wasabi", a song by Cibo Matto
The Wasabies, a Mongolian girl group

In computing
Wasabi (software), GUI toolkit
WASABI (software), emotion simulation
Wasabi Technologies, US object storage service provider

In other uses
 Wasabi (restaurant), UK chain
 Wasabi Mizuta, Japanese voice actor

See also
Wassabi, Romanian musical group